Dariusz Sylwester Szubert (born 31 October 1970) is a Polish football coach and former player, who played as a midfielder.

Honours
 Olympics silver medal: 1992

References

External links
 
 

1970 births
Living people
People from Białogard
Sportspeople from West Pomeranian Voivodeship
Polish footballers
Association football midfielders
Poland international footballers
Olympic footballers of Poland
Footballers at the 1992 Summer Olympics
Medalists at the 1992 Summer Olympics
Olympic silver medalists for Poland
Olympic medalists in football
Ekstraklasa players
Bundesliga players
2. Bundesliga players
Belgian Pro League players
Pogoń Szczecin players
FC St. Pauli players
VfB Oldenburg players
FC Zürich players
K.F.C. Lommel S.K. players
Widzew Łódź players
1. FC Germania Egestorf/Langreder players
Polish expatriate footballers
Polish expatriate sportspeople in Germany
Expatriate footballers in Germany
Polish expatriate sportspeople in Switzerland
Expatriate footballers in Switzerland
Polish expatriate sportspeople in Belgium
Expatriate footballers in Belgium